Reymersholms IK is a sports club located in Stockholm and was founded on 1 September 1899. From the 1920s to the 1940s the club was successful in bandy, football  and ice hockey. Today football is the only sport in the club. The club is affiliated to Stockholms Fotbollförbund which is a district organisation of the Swedish Football Association.

The men's team plays in Division 3 Södra Svealand which is the 5 tier of Swedish football. The women's team plays in the Women's Division 4.

The club's home matches are played at the home ground Zinkensdamms IP.

History

The men's football team played one season at the highest national level in the Allsvenskan in 1941–42 and over the period 1924–25 until 1949–50 played 19 seasons in Division 2 which at that time was the second tier of Swedish football. The men's bandy team played nine seasons at the highest national level, the first season in 1935–36 and the last in 1947–48. The men's ice hockey team played in the top Swedish division in the 1930s and 1940s.

Season to season

During their most successful period Reymersholms IK's men's team competed in the following divisions:

In recent seasons Reymersholms IK have competed in the following divisions:

Attendances

In recent seasons Reymersholms IK have had the following average attendances:

Footnotes

External links
 Reymersholms IK – Official website
 Reymersholms IK on Facebook

Football clubs in Stockholm
Defunct bandy clubs in Sweden
Association football clubs established in 1899
Bandy clubs established in 1899
1899 establishments in Sweden